Frank Ginda (born May 26, 1997) is an American football linebacker for the Michigan Panthers of the United States Football League (USFL). He played college football at San Jose State.

Early years
Ginda attended Pacheco High School in Los Banos, California. Along with football, he also participated in basketball and track and field. Ginda committed to play football at San Jose State University on October 14, 2014.

College career
As a true freshman in 2015, Ginda played in 13 games, making 12 starts, tallying 80 tackles, 4.5 tackles for loss, and one sack. Ginda was named true freshman of the year after having a stellar year.

In 2016, as a sophomore, Ginda played in 12 games, making 99 tackles and 11.5 tackles for loss, including five games with ten or more tackles. In addition, he had 6.5 sacks, two forced fumbles, two fumble recoveries, and one interception.

As a junior in 2017, Ginda was the NCAA leading tackler with 173 total tackles, with 94 being solo. His 173 total tackles is most in Mountain West Conference history. He was named to All-Mountain West Conference first-team. After the season, he declared for the 2018 NFL Draft, foregoing his senior season.

Professional career

Arizona Cardinals
Ginda signed with the Arizona Cardinals as an undrafted free agent on April 30, 2018. He was waived on June 15, 2018 after coaching changes played a huge factor in his release.

Miami Dolphins
On July 24, 2018, Ginda signed with the Miami Dolphins. During the preseason, Ginda saw action on defense and special teams where he totaled 22 tackles, four tackles for loss, and a forced fumble. In the final preseason game, Ginda led the team with 10 tackles, two tackles for loss, and a forced fumble in a 34-7 win over the Atlanta Falcons. Ginda was waived on the last day of roster cuts on September 1, 2018. Following final roster cuts, Ginda was signed to the practice squad.

San Diego Fleet
On October 14, 2018, Ginda signed with the San Diego Fleet. During his time in the AAF before it folded, Ginda lead his team with 41 total tackles including 4 for loss, 2 pass break-ups, and one forced fumble that was returned for a touchdown. The league ceased operations in April 2019.

New Orleans Saints

On May 3, 2019, Ginda signed with the New Orleans Saints. Ginda was a part of the team through the 2019 OTAs and preseason with the team before getting waived on the last day of roster cuts on September 1, 2019.

New York Guardians
In October 2019, Ginda was selected by the New York Guardians in the open phase of the 2020 XFL Draft. Ginda was chosen as one of six captains as the youngest player on the roster. Ginda ended the season with 31 tackles, 5 for a loss, and 2 QB hurries. He had his contract terminated when the league suspended operations on April 10, 2020.

Michigan Panthers
Ginda was selected by the Michigan Panthers in the 2022 USFL Draft. Ginda was picked by his peers as one of four team captains. During the USFL inaugural season, Ginda finished with 90 tackles which was #2 in the league, 10 tackles for loss, 4 QB pressures, 2 sacks, and 1 forced fumble.

References

External links

San Jose State bio

1997 births
Living people
People from Los Banos, California
Players of American football from California
American football linebackers
San Jose State Spartans football players
Arizona Cardinals players
Miami Dolphins players
San Diego Fleet players
New York Guardians players
Michigan Panthers (2022) players